Saudi Arabia competed at the 2008 Summer Olympics in Beijing, China.
As in years past, Saudi Arabia sent only male representatives to Beijing. The International Olympic Committee is reportedly pressuring the Saudi Olympic Committee to send female athletes to the 2012 Summer Olympics.

Saudi athletes competed in five sports: athletics, shooting, swimming, weightlifting and equestrian.

Athletics

Men
Track & road events

Field events

Equestrian

Show jumping

Shooting 

Men

Swimming

Men

Weightlifting

References

Nations at the 2008 Summer Olympics
2008
Summer Olympics